Asaphodes aphelias is a species of moth in the family Geometridae. It is endemic to New Zealand and has been observed in Fiordland. This species inhabits damp native scrub and has been observed in upland wetlands at altitudes of between 800 to 1100 m. Adults are on the wing in February but the female of this species is unusual as it has narrow fore and hind wings.

Taxonomy 

This species was first described by Philpott under the name Xanthorhoe helias obscura. In 1939 George Hudson discussed and illustrated this species under the name Xanthorhoe obscura. In 1939 Louis Beethoven Prout provided a new name for this species, naming it Xanthorhoe aphelias. Prout did so as the species originally named Scotocoremia obscura Butler, 1882 was at that point in time placed in the genus Xanthorhoe and Philpott had raised Xanthorhoe helias obscura to the rank of species. In 1971 J. S. Dugdale placed this species in the genus Asaphodes. In 1988 Dugdale affirmed this placement in his catalogue of New Zealand Lepidoptera. The holotype specimen, a male collected from Hump Ridge in Fiordland by Alfred Philpott, is held at the New Zealand Arthropod Collection.

Description

Philpott first described this species, as a subspecies, as follows:
The female of this species is unusual as it has narrow fore and hind wings.

Distribution 
This species is endemic to New Zealand. It has been observed in Fiordland.

Habitat 
A. apelias inhabits damp native scrub and has been observed in upland wetlands at altitudes of between 800 to 1100 m.

Behaviour 
The adults of this species are on the wing in February.

References

Moths described in 1939
Moths of New Zealand
Larentiinae
Endemic fauna of New Zealand
Taxa named by Louis Beethoven Prout
Endemic moths of New Zealand